Mycosphaerella palmicola is a fungal plant pathogen.

See also
List of Mycosphaerella species

References

Fungal plant pathogens and diseases
palmicola
Fungi described in 1964